25th Anniversary Collection is a compilation album by KC and the Sunshine Band, released in 1999. It is the most comprehensive KC and the Sunshine Band collection to date, containing nearly every single released during the band 1970s heyday, along with a small sampling of later tracks.

Track listing

Disc one

Disc two

Personnel
Harry Wayne Casey – keyboards, vocals
Jerome Smith – guitar
Richard Finch – bass guitar, drums, percussion
Robert Johnson – drums
Oliver Brown – percussion
Fermin Goytisolo – percussion
Ken Faulk – trumpet
Vinnie Tanno – trumpet
Mike Lewis – tenor saxophone
Whit Sidener – baritone saxophone
Beverly Champion – background vocals
Margaret Reynolds – background vocals
Jeanette Williams – background vocals

References

KC and the Sunshine Band albums
1990 compilation albums
Rhino Entertainment compilation albums